IBAIS University (IBAIS: International Business Administration and Information System) is a private, nonprofit educational institution in Bangladesh.

Faculties/Department

Faculty of Humanities & Law
 Department of English
 Department of Tourism & Hotel Management
 Department of Law

Faculty of Business & Economics
 Department of Business Administration
 Department of Economics

Faculty of Science & Engineering
 Department of Computer Science & Engineering
 Department of Electrical & Electronic Engineering

Institutes
Center for Research & Training

List of vice-chancellors 
 Prof. Mohammed Ahsan Ullah ( present )

Grading system

Academic calendar
The academic system of IBAISU consists with three semesters:
 Spring semester
 Summer semester
 Fall semester

External links
 IBAIS University
 University Grants Commission of Bangladesh

References 

Educational institutions established in 2002
Private universities in Bangladesh
Universities and colleges in Dhaka
2002 establishments in Bangladesh